Ivey Merwin Shiver (January 22, 1907 – August 31, 1972), nicknamed "Chick", was an American football  and baseball player. He was an end for the Georgia Bulldogs football team in college, and later an outfielder in Major League Baseball. He played in the major leagues for the Detroit Tigers and Cincinnati Reds,  and for several teams in the Minor Leagues. Shiver was captain of the Georgia "dream and wonder team" of 1927, selected All-Southern and All-American that same year. He was a renowned punter. He left baseball and the San Diego Padres after 1936 to coach football in Savannah. This left a spot for Ted Williams. He was the athletic director and head coach at Armstrong Junior College from 1937 to 1941, and won a state title at Savannah High School in 1942, where he coached from 1941 to 1952.

References

External links

1907 births
1972 deaths
American football ends
American football punters
Major League Baseball outfielders
Cincinnati Reds players
Detroit Tigers players
Georgia Bulldogs baseball players
Georgia Bulldogs football players
All-American college football players
All-Southern college football players
High school football coaches in Georgia (U.S. state)
Junior college football coaches in the United States
Sportspeople from Savannah, Georgia
People from Sylvester, Georgia
Baseball players from Savannah, Georgia
Players of American football from Savannah, Georgia